Alexandra Bircken (born 1967) is a German artist. She is based in Berlin and Munich. Bircken creates assemblages featuring everyday ephemera like wood, knitted fragments and twigs. Her work has strong references to traditional craft practices and to the natural world, from which she sources her materials.

Early life and education 
Alexandra Bircken was born in Cologne, Germany, in 1967. 
She earned a BA in Fashion Design from Central Saint Martins College of Art and Design in London in 1995, after which she founded her own fashion label. In 2000, Bircken returned to Central Saint Martins, where she was a professor until 2008. In 2014, Bircken was awarded an artist residency by the British Council in Harare, Zimbabwe.

Exhibitions 
Alexandra Bircken's work has been exhibited at Museum Abteiberg in Mönchengladbach, the Kunstverein Hannover, the New Museum in New York, the National Gallery of Zimbabwe, the Stedelijk Museum in Amsterdam, the Hepworth Wakefield in West Yorkshire, and the Whitechapel Gallery in London. In 2019, her work was included in the group exhibition, May You Live In Interesting Times, curated by Ralph Rugoff and presented at the 58th International Art Exhibition of La Biennale di Venezia in Italy.

Solo exhibitions

Group exhibitions

References

External links 
 Official website

German women artists
Assemblage artists
1967 births
Living people